Chess symbols are part of Unicode. Instead of using images, one can represent chess pieces by characters that are defined in the Unicode character set. This makes it possible to:
 Use figurine algebraic notation, which replaces the letter that stands for a piece by its symbol, e.g.  ♘c6 instead of Nc6. This enables the moves to be read independent of language (the letter abbreviations of pieces in algebraic notation vary from language to language).
 Produce the symbols using a text editor or word processor rather than a graphics editor.

In order to display or print these symbols, a device must have one or more fonts with good Unicode support installed, and the document (Web page, word processor document, etc.) it is displaying must use one of these fonts.

Unicode version 12.0 has allocated a whole character block at 0x1FA00 for inclusion of extra chess piece representations. This standard points to several new characters being created in this block, including rotated pieces and neutral (neither white nor black) pieces.

Unicode characters

In Unicode, chess symbols are in two groups:
 Regular chess symbols, the basic six pieces in black and white (as part of Unicode block Miscellaneous Symbols), and
 Uncommon and fairy chess pieces and xiangqi pieces, in a block named Chess Symbols.

The basic 12 chess pieces

Fairy chess pieces and xiangqi pieces

Chessboard using Unicode

References

Chess notation
Chess
Chess